A Theory of Everything: An Integral Vision for Business, Politics, Science, and Spirituality is a 2000 book by Ken Wilber detailing the author's approach, called Integral theory, to building a conceptual model of the World that encompasses both its physical and spiritual dimensions. He posits a unified ground-of-everything he calls Spirit.

The book's first four chapters cover the physical and mental development of this unified ground. Beliefnet.com says that this book is, "Wilber's shortest, simplest overview of his work."

See also 
 Sex, Ecology, Spirituality - book by the same author, sometimes considered his magnum opus

Notes

2000 non-fiction books
American non-fiction books
Books by Ken Wilber
English-language books
Integral theory (Ken Wilber)